2010 Commonwealth of Independent States Cup was the eighteenth edition of the competition between the champions of former republics of Soviet Union. It was won by Rubin Kazan for the first time.

Participants

 1 Rubin Kazan were represented by reserve players.
 2 Dynamo Kyiv were represented by a reserve team Dynamo-2 Kyiv.
 3 Dnepr Mogilev replaced BATE Borisov (2009 Belarusian champions), who declined to participate.
 4 Dacia Chișinău replaced Sheriff Tiraspol (2008–09 Moldovan champions), who declined to participate.
 5 Pyunik Yerevan were represented by reserve and trial players.
 6 Bunyodkor Tashkent were represented by reserve players.
 7 HJK Helsinki invited by the organizing committee to replace  WIT Georgia Tbilisi (2008–09 Georgian champions), who declined to participate along with other Georgian teams due to 2008 South Ossetian War.

Group stage

Group A

Results

Group B

Results

Group C
Unofficial table

Official table

Results

Group D

Results

Final rounds

Bracket

Quarter-finals

Semi-finals

Final

Top scorers

External links
 Russian Football Union Official web-site 
 Commonwealth of Independent States Cup 2010 at rsssf
 2010 CIS Cup at kick-off.by

2009
2010 in Russian football
2009–10 in Ukrainian football
2009–10 in European football
January 2010 sports events in Russia
2010 in Moscow